Rhea Fairbairn of Canada (born 15 Jan 1890; died 24 Apr 1953) was an amateur tennis player.

Fairbairn, who was a member of the tennis team at the University of Toronto, reached the finals of the Canadian Championships in 1910. She finished runner-up to Louise Moyes losing 4–6, 0–6.

Fairbairn reached the singles final at the 1915 Ohio state tournament, falling to Canadian Tennis Hall of Fame inductee Louise Moyes again (losing 3–6, 2–6).

At the Cincinnati Masters, Fairbairn won the doubles title in 1913 (with Helen McLaughlin) and was a singles finalist in 1910.

She married Frank Marty of Ft. Thomas, Kentucky, in 1912. She died on April 24, 1953 in Ft. Thomas.

Sources
From Club Court to Center Court by Phillip S. Smith (2008 Edition)
 Find a Grave - https://www.findagrave.com/memorial/89384232/rhea-beatrice-marty

Canadian female tennis players
1890 births
1953 deaths
American female tennis players
Tennis players from Cincinnati